Pterolophia freyi is a species of beetle in the family Cerambycidae. It was described by Stephan von Breuning in 1953.

References

freyi
Beetles described in 1953